Callibaetis is a genus of small minnow mayflies in the family Baetidae. There are at least 30 described species in Callibaetis.

Species
These 31 species belong to the genus Callibaetis.

References

Further reading

External links

 

Mayflies
Mayfly genera
Insects of Europe